Tempest is an American Celtic rock band from the San Francisco Bay Area, based in Oakland, California. They fuse the traditional Celtic music with Norwegian and European folk, American folk, and progressive rock.

History
The band formed in 1988 with Lief Sorbye (mandolin, vocals), Adolfo Lazo (drums), Rob Wullenjohn (guitar), and Mark Showalter (bass). The band has seen a changing cast of musicians, with Sorbye and Lazo being the only two constant members throughout the duration of the band's existence.

The current lineup consists of Lief Sorbye (mandolin, vocals), Adolfo Lazo (percussion), Lee Corbie-Wells (fiddle), Nikolay Georgiev (guitar), and Hugh Caley (bass), with members from around the world:  Lief from Oslo, Norway, Adolfo Lazo from Havana, Cuba, Lee Corbie-Wells from San Francisco, California, and Hugh Caley from Detroit, Michigan and Nikolay Georgiev from Pleven, Bulgaria. In 2010, Tempest released Another Dawn - it was Tempest's 11th full-length studio album. In 2006, Tempest released their 10th full-length studio album, entitled The Double-Cross. In 2007, the band released a live CD, entitled Lief's Birthday Bash. The Birthday Bash CD was recorded on the evening of 23 March 2007 at Ashkenaz Dance Community Center in Berkeley, and features tracks including a number of musicians that Lief has played with over the years: both past Tempest members and some members of Golden Bough as well. Much of the recent live CD is actually acoustic.

The band has held the honor of being invited to play a number of times at the Philadelphia Folk Festival and they also host an eclectic music and arts festival of their own, in Auburn, California, on the first weekend of May each year. The festival is called Karfluki Fest, and has featured such artists as It's A Beautiful Day, Big Brother and the Holding Company, Fairport Convention, Shana Morrison, Wicked Tinkers and Fishtank Ensemble, in addition to an array of side show acts such as belly dancers, a sword swallower, jugglers, acrobats and fire dancers.

Other projects
Frontman Lief Sorbye occasionally plays in an acoustic Celtic folk duo called Caliban, usually joined by a current or former Tempest fiddler, such as Kathy Buys, Michael Mullen, or Sue Draheim. They have released one self-titled recording and often do shows during Tempest tours. Lief Sorbye has also released two solo albums, Springdans (1987) and Across the Borders (1994). Incumbent fiddler Kathy Buys was the fiddler with a world fusion band called The Druid Sisters Tea Party. Former bassist John Land was previously in a band called Coyote Pudding. They had one release, titled Joking, Drunk, or Bored as Hell.

Personnel

Members
Current
 Adolfo Lazo - drums (1988-present)
 Lief Sorbye - vocals, mandolin (1988-present)
 Lee Corbie-Wells - fiddle (2020-present)
 Nikolay Georgiev - guitar (2020-present)
 Hugh Caley - bass (2021-present)

Former

 Mark Showalter - bass (1988-1989)
 Rob Wullenjohn - guitar (1988-1998)
 Ian Butler - bass (1989-1995)
 Michael Mullen - fiddle (1992-1993, 1996-2001, 2004-2012)
 Jon Berger - fiddle (1993-1996)
 Jay Nania - bass (1995-1998)
 John Land - bass (1998-2000)
 Dave Parnall - guitar (1998-1999)
 Todd Evans - guitar (1999-2002)
 Darren Cassidy - bass (2000-2001)
 Jim "Hurricane" Hurley - fiddle (2001-2002)
 William Maxwell - bass (2001-2002)
 Sue Draheim - fiddle (2002-2004)
 Joel Monte Mahan - guitar (2002-2003)
 Mark Skowronek - bass (2002-2004)
 Ronan Carroll - guitar (2003-2007)
 Ariane Cap - bass (2004-2007)
 James Crocker - guitar (2007-2011)
 Damien Gonzalez - bass (2007-2011)
 Brian Fox - bass (2011-2012)
 Greg Jones - guitar (2011-2016)
 Kathy Buys - fiddle (2012-2020)
 Caith Threefires - bass (2012-2013)
 Vince Lucchesi - bass (2013-2015)
 Josh Fossgreen - bass (2015-2019)
 Ab Menon - guitar (2016-2019)
 Kevin Florian - guitar (2019-2020)
 Mirco Melone - bass (2019-2021)

Lineups

Timeline

Discography

Studio albums
Bootleg (1991)
Serrated Edge (1992)
Surfing to Mecca (1994)
Turn of the Wheel (1996)
The Gravel Walk (1997)
Balance (2001)
Shapeshifter (2003)
The Double-Cross (2006)
Another Dawn (2010)
The Tracks We Leave (2015)
Thirty Little Turns (2018)

Live albums
Live at the Philadelphia Folk Festival (2000)
Lief's Birthday Bash Party (2007)

Compilation albums
Sunken Treasures (1993)
The 10th Anniversary Compilation (1998)
15th Anniversary Collection Box Set (2004)
Prime Cuts (2008)

References

External links

Celtic music groups
Folk rock groups from California
Magna Carta Records artists
Musical groups established in 1988